Diaphananthe is a genus of flowering plants from the orchid family, Orchidaceae. As currently conceived, it contains 33 accepted species, all endemic to sub-Saharan Africa.

Species 
Diaphananthe arbonnieri Geerinck
Diaphananthe bidens (Afzel. ex Sw.) Schltr.
Diaphananthe bueae (Schltr.) Schltr.
Diaphananthe ceriflora J.B.Petersen
Diaphananthe delepierreana J.-P.Lebel & Geerinck
Diaphananthe divitiflora (Kraenzl.) Schltr.
Diaphananthe dorotheae (Rendle) Summerh.
Diaphananthe eggelingii P.J.Cribb
Diaphananthe fragrantissima (Rchb.f.) Schltr.
Diaphananthe gabonensis (Summerh.) P.J.Cribb & Carlsward
Diaphananthe garayana Szlach. & Olszewski
Diaphananthe ichneumonea (Lindl.) P.J.Cribb & Carlsward
Diaphananthe lanceolata (Summerh.) P.J.Cribb & Carlsward
Diaphananthe lecomtei (Finet) P.J.Cribb & Carlsward
Diaphananthe letouzeyi (Szlach. & Olszewski) P.J.Cribb & Carlsward
Diaphananthe lorifolia Summerh.
Diaphananthe millarii (Bolus) H.P.Linder
Diaphananthe odoratissima (Rchb.f.) P.J.Cribb & Carlsward
Diaphananthe pellucida (Lindl.) Schltr.
Diaphananthe plehniana (Schltr.) Schltr.
Diaphananthe rohrii (Rchb.f.) Summerh.
Diaphananthe sanfordiana Szlach. & Olszewski
Diaphananthe sarcophylla (Schltr. ex Prain) P.J.Cribb & Carlsward
Diaphananthe sarcorhynchoides J.B.Hall
Diaphananthe spiralis (Stévart & Droissart) P.J.Cribb & Carlsward
Diaphananthe subclavata (Rolfe) Schltr.
Diaphananthe suborbicularis Summerh.
Diaphananthe thomensis (Rolfe) P.J.Cribb & Carlsward
Diaphananthe trigonopetala Schltr.
Diaphananthe vagans (Lindl.) P.J.Cribb & Carlsward
Diaphananthe vandiformis (Kraenzl.) Schltr.
Diaphananthe vesicata (Lindl.) P.J.Cribb & Carlsward
Diaphananthe welwitschii (Rchb.f.) Schltr

See also 
List of Orchidaceae genera

References 

  (Eds) (2014) Genera Orchidacearum Volume 6: Epidendroideae (Part 3); page 385 ff., Oxford: Oxford University Press. 
  Handbuch der Orchideen-Namen. Dictionary of Orchid Names. Dizionario dei nomi delle orchidee. Ulmer, Stuttgart

External links 

Vandeae genera
Orchids of Africa
Angraecinae